The Saint Valentine's Day Massacre is a name given to a gangland shooting that occurred on Saint Valentine's Day, February 14, 1929.

St. Valentine's Day massacre may also refer to:

Events
The 1349 Strasbourg massacre, part of the Black Death persecutions
The 1943 World War II attack on Kahili Airfield resulting in US loss of aircraft (Vought F4U Corsair#Marine Corps combat)
The 1951 middleweight boxing match between Sugar Ray Robinson and Jake LaMotta, the sixth contest between the two
The two-day firefight in 1970 during the Vietnam War that claimed the lives of 13 American soldiers and more than 30 North Vietnamese fighters
St. Valentine's Day Massacre: In Your House, a 1999 professional wrestling event
Northern Illinois University shooting which occurred in a college in DeKalb, Illinois on February 14, 2008
Stoneman Douglas High School shooting, which occurred in Parkland, Florida on February 14, 2018
2019 Pulwama attack, which occurred in Pulwama, Jammu and Kashmir, on February 14, 2019

Bands
The Artwoods, formerly known as St. Valentine's Day Massacre, a mid-1960s British band

Media
The St. Valentine's Day Massacre (film), a 1967 film
St. Valentine's Day Massacre (EP), a 1981 EP by Motörhead and Girlschool
The Massacre, originally called The St. Valentine's Day Massacre, a 2005 album by 50 Cent
Saint Valentine's Day Massacre, a 2009 album by (The) Cocktail Slippers
Saint Valentine's Day Massacre, the title track of the 2009 album by (The) Cocktail Slippers